Kaikamba also known as Gurupura Kaikamba is a suburban town of Mangalore, Dakshina Kannada District, Karnataka State, west coast of India. Kaikamba lies between Moodabidri and Mangalore city in Dakshina Kannada district.  This town lies on Mangalore – Moodabidri Highway National Highway 169 (Old No. NH 13). It is 8 km away from Bajpe, where Mangalore International Airport is located. Population of Kaikamba is about 15,325 as per 2009 census. Parts of Kaikamba are administered by Kandavara Panchayat and Ganjimutt Panchayat. Efforts are being made to include this town into Mangalore city corporation limits by the year 2015. The proposed KIADB Software export promotional park is 5 km away. 

The geographical location of guide-pole at Kaikamba is exactly 12.9607° North and 74.9332° East and it is situated approximately 100 meters above sea level. It also a place of 1 church 3 mosques and 3 temples.

Media
The online news portal of Kaikamba town is Suddi9

Etymology
The word "Kaikamba" means "hand-post" or "guide-pole" in both Kannada and Tulu languages.  The word is used mostly for junctions of roads in Tulunadu as in olden days a wooden pole was fixed in  the middle of the junction indicating direction of places.  This small junction town - linking a three-way road network that lead to Bajpe, Mangalore and Moodabidri – has a hand-post guiding tourists and visitors.

Commerce and industries 
Mangalore tile factories are few in numbers. There are also beedi works, cashew nut industries and rice processing industries, as well as a number of poultry farms, cashew plantations and paddy cultivation. Real estate business is another major commercial area. The proposed Ganjimutt SEZ is just 5 km away from this location.

People and culture 

All the people are literate. A speciality of this town is that every family has at least one member abroad, the majority of them in the Middle East. In terms of religion, Hindus, Muslims and Christians are in almost equal proportion, although Hinduism is the major religion followed. Languages spoken are mainly Tulu, Konkani, Beary and Urdu, and many have knowledge of Kannada, Hindi and English.

Festivals like Diwali, Eid ul-Fitr, Vijayadashami, Eid al-Adha, Christmas and Dasara are celebrated; the festival most celebrated is Ganesh Chaturthi. People live in peace: there have been very few conflicts between these religions as compared to other suburbs in Mangalore.

Nearby places 
The nearby places are 
Gurupura 3 km,
Ganjimutt 3 km,
Airport 6 km,
Suralpady 1 km,
Addur 3 km,
Polali 5 km,
Bajpe 5 km,
Moodabidri 15 km,
Mangalore 15 km

Educational institutions 
 Al Khair Islamic English Medium School, Suralpady
 Pompei  Kannada Medium School
 Govt Kannada Medium Primary School, Kinnikambla
 Govt Urdu Medium Primary School 
 Assraruddin Kambal Urdu High School
 Assraruddin Kambal (AKU) English Medium Primary School 
 Balmy English Medium School
 Rosa Mystica Kannada Medium Primary & High School
 Assraruddin Arabic College
 Raj Academy English Medium Primary & High school
 Ideal English Medium School
 Ideal English Medium High School
 Pana Pre-University
 Our Lady of Pompei  English Medium School
 Bethany English Medium School

Temples, mosques and churches 
 Jamia Masjid, Kaikamba City
 Shree Doomavathi Daivastana Bailu Magane
 Rajarajeshwawi Temple, Polali
 Our Lady Of Pompeii Church, Kawdoor
 Malharul Awakif Jumma Masjid (The White Masjid), Suralpady
 Shree Mahaganapathy Temple, Ganjimutt
 Brahma Balandi Temple, Mooduperar
 Jamia Masjid, Ganjimutt
 Hazrath Assraruddin Awliah Allah Dargah & Masjid, Gurukambala
 Hazrath Assraruddin Jamia Masjid, Gurukambala
 Sri Ram Bhajana Madira, Narla
 Sri Radha Krishna Bhajana Mandira, Kinnikambla
 Jamia Masjid, Kandavara Padav
 Al-Masjidul Badriya, Kandavara Padavu
 Jamaliya Jumma Masjid, Bailpete
 Noorul Islam Madrasa, Moodukare

Social clubs
 Challengers Friends Circle (C.F.C), Suralpady (R)
 JCI Gurupura Kaikamba (started in 2005)
 Rotary Lions Club
 K.Y.C. NARLA
 Sri Rama Sevanjali, Kandavara Padavu, Kaikamba
 Sarvajanika Ganeshothsava Seva Sammithi, Benaka Dama, Kaikamba
 Yaksha Tharangini, Kaikamba
 Knight Riders Sports and Welfare Association

Banks and financial institutions 
 Bank of Baroda
 Canara Bank
 Karavali Credit Co-operative Society 
 Karnataka Vikas Grameena Bank
 Sri Bagavathi Sahakari Bank
 SCDCC Bank 
 Kumbara Gudi Kaigarika Bank, Malali
 State Bank of India
 Axis Bank ATM

Getting there 
 The nearest railway station is Mangalore - 18 km
 The nearest airport is Bajpe or Mangalore International Airport which is just 8 km 15 minutes
 Mangalore city buses No. 12 and 22, 22S (Jnnurm Bus) goes via Kaikamba - 19 km, 45 minutes
 All the buses between Mangalore and Moodabidri go via Kaikamba - 19 km /  30 minutes, which includes both express and local buses, which are the most commonly used for travelling to Mangalore.

References

See also 
 Mangalore International Airport

Villages in Dakshina Kannada district